Richard William Curless (March 17, 1932 – May 25, 1995) was an American country music singer. He usually wore a patch over his right eye.

Biography
Curless was born in Fort Fairfield, Maine, United States, and moved with his family to Massachusetts at the age of eight. He began his music career in 1948 in Ware, Massachusetts, where he hosted a radio show and toured with a local band called the Trail Blazers.

He married his wife, Pauline, in 1951, and only six months after the wedding, he was drafted into the United States Army. He served in the Korean War from 1952 to 1954 first as a truck driver and later as a radio host with the stage name "Rice Paddy Ranger".

He returned home to Maine in 1954 and continued performing on radio shows, but he spent much of the following year, 1955, at home due to a chronic illness.

In 1957, Curless returned to the public spotlight and appeared on the CBS television show Arthur Godfrey's Talent Scouts. He spent much of the late 1950s performing in clubs in California and Las Vegas but occasionally returned home to Maine to recover from periods of illness and fatigue. While in Maine, Curless recorded several singles including "China Nights" at Event Records with Al Hawkes. Eventually he temporarily left the music industry and bought his own lumber trucking vehicle in Maine.

In 1965, Curless recorded one of the biggest hits of his career, "A Tombstone Every Mile", which cracked the top 5 on the Billboard country charts and propelled him to national fame. In 1966, he recorded the album A Devil Like Me Needs an Angel Like You with Kay Adams. From 1966 to 1968, he toured the nation with the Buck Owens All American Show. The pinnacle of his career came in the late 1960s with eleven top-40 hits, including "Six Times a Day (the Trains Came Down)". Altogether, he recorded 22 Billboard top-40 hits throughout his career.

After his success in 1970 with the hits "Big Wheel Cannonball" and "Hard, Hard Traveling Man", he recorded infrequently until he released the albums Welcome to My World and It's Just a Matter of Time in Norway in 1987. The albums were successful in Europe, especially in Norway and Germany.

Curless recorded an album with German country musician Tom Astor in 1991. During the later part of his life, he performed often at the Cristy Lane Theater in Branson, Missouri.

Curless died of stomach cancer in 1995, aged 63.

Discography

Albums

Singles

References

External links
[ Dick Curless: Allmusic Overview]

1932 births
1995 deaths
20th-century American singers
20th-century American male singers
American country singer-songwriters
American male singer-songwriters
Capitol Records artists
Deaths from cancer in Maine
Deaths from stomach cancer
People from Ware, Massachusetts
Singer-songwriters from Massachusetts
United States Army soldiers
United States Army personnel of the Korean War